Milen Manchev (Bulgarian: Милен Манчев; born 2000) is a Bulgarian footballer who plays as a midfielder for TuS Mayen.

Career

CSKA Sofia
On 31 May 2017 he made his debut for CSKA Sofia in match against Dunav Ruse.

Career statistics

Club

References

External links
 

2001 births
Living people
Bulgarian footballers
PFC CSKA Sofia players
Association football midfielders